The first season of the Brazilian competitive reality television series MasterChef Profissionais premiered on October 4, 2016 at 10:30 p.m. on Band.

Chef Dayse Paparoto won the competition over chef Marcelo Verde on December 13, 2016.

Contestants

Top 14
Source:

Elimination table

Key

Ratings and reception

Brazilian ratings
All numbers are in points and provided by IBOPE.

 In 2016, each point represents 69.417 households in São Paulo.
Note: Episode 2 aired against the Venezuela vs. Brazil football match for the 2018 FIFA World Cup qualification.

References

External links
 MasterChef Profissionais on Band
 

2016 Brazilian television seasons
MasterChef (Brazilian TV series)